The Lasting Impression of Hugh Masekela is a 1968 live album by South African jazz musician Hugh Masekela.

Background
The album was released by MGM Records label, which Masekela left several years ago. It was recorded at The Village Gate, New York City, in November 1965 during the same sessions as The Americanization of Ooga Booga and released as a separate album in December 1968. In 1996 Verve Records released a CD named The Lasting Impression of Ooga-Booga, which included tracks from The Americanization of Ooga Booga and five tracks from the present record without "Child of the Earth".

Reception
A reviewer of Dusty Groove stated: "One of Hugh's best albums for MGM – with some tracks that are longer than his late 60s pop tunes, and which feature him stretching out more in a soulful mode, hitting some fuzzy Afro funk grooves that are very nice! Hugh's soulful trumpet is in fine fine form..." Bruce Eder of AllMusic wrote: "The remainder of Hugh Masekela's winter 1965 Village Gate set sat in the can for three years, until 'Grazing in the Grass' became a hit in 1968 on the Uni label. Then the label rushed out with the six-track Lasting Impressions of Hugh Masekela LP, which was a match musically for its predecessor, The Americanization of Ooga Booga."

Track listing

Personnel
Art direction – Acy R. Lehman
Engineer (director) – Val Valentin
Liner notes – Kathleen Boyle
Photography, cover – Rudy Legname
Photography, liner – Chuck Stewart
Producer – Tom Wilson

References

External links

1968 live albums
MGM Records albums
Hugh Masekela albums
Albums produced by Tom Wilson (record producer)
Albums recorded at the Village Gate